Jörg Graser (born 30 December 1951) is a German film director and screenwriter. His film Abraham's Gold was screened in the Un Certain Regard section at the 1990 Cannes Film Festival.

Filmography
 Trokadero (dir. Klaus Emmerich, 1981)
 Der Mond is nur a nackerte Kugel (1981)
 Magdalena (1983, TV film) — (based on a play by Ludwig Thoma)
 Via Mala (dir. Tom Toelle, 1985, TV miniseries) — (based on Via Mala by John Knittel)
 Storms in May (dir. Xaver Schwarzenberger, 1987, TV film) — (based on Storms in May by Ludwig Ganghofer)
 Abraham's Gold (1990)
 Ich schenk dir die Sterne (1991)
 Drei Sekunden Ewigkeit (1995, TV film)

References

External links

1951 births
Living people
Film people from Baden-Württemberg
Mass media people from Heidelberg